Biechów may refer to the following places:
Biechów, Opole Voivodeship (south-west Poland)
Biechów, Busko County in Świętokrzyskie Voivodeship (south-central Poland)
Biechów, Ostrowiec County in Świętokrzyskie Voivodeship (south-central Poland)